Naomi Broady was the defending champion, but lost in the first round to Miharu Imanishi.

Kristýna Plíšková won the title, defeating Nao Hibino in the final, 7–5, 6–4.

Seeds

Main draw

Finals

Top half

Bottom half

References 
 Main draw

Fukuoka International Women's Cup - Singles
Fukuoka International Women's Cup